The Department of Health is a Western Australian government department responsible for regulating and advancing health within the state. It manages a system of multiple Health Service Providers (HSPs) which make up Western Australia's public health system, and is collectively referred to as WA Health. WA Health covers a state which spans over 2.5 million square kilometres, making it the world's largest single health authority by area.

History
The Public Health Department of Western Australia operated between 1911 and 1984. It merged with Mental Health Services and the Department of Hospital and Allied Services in July 1984, to become the Health Department of Western Australia. In September 2001, it was renamed to the Department of Health.

Preceding agencies
 Medical Department, 1 January 18501 October 1906
 Central Board of Health, 17 November 188631 May 1911
 Public Health Department of Western Australia, 1 June 191130 June 1984
 Department of Hospital and Allied Services, 30 April 198130 June 1984

See also
List of hospitals in Western Australia

References

Further reading

External links
 

Health
Medical and health organisations based in Western Australia
Western Australia